Ornette on Tenor is the eighth album by the American jazz composer and saxophonist Ornette Coleman, released in 1962 on Atlantic Records, his sixth and final one for the label. It features Coleman playing tenor saxophone rather than his usual alto, and bassist Jimmy Garrison before he joined the John Coltrane Quartet. This would be the last record by the Coleman Quartet started in the 1950s; he would disband this group and form the Coleman Trio later in the year. Recording sessions took place on March 22 and 27, 1961, at Atlantic Studios in New York City. One outtake from the March 27 session, "Harlem's Manhattan," would appear on the 1970 compilation The Art of the Improvisers.

Reception

Down Beat magazine critic Harvey Pekar said of the album in his five-star review of January 3, 1963: "Coleman has scored another major success with this album. Most of the space is devoted to improvisation, but there are also several provocative compositions."

The Allmusic review by Steve Huey awarded the album 3½ stars, stating: "it's probably his least stunning Atlantic, not quite as revolutionary or memorable as many of its predecessors, but still far ahead of its time ... it's hard not to be a little disappointed that Ornette on Tenor doesn't have the boundary-shattering impact of his previous work—but then again, it's probably asking too much to expect a revolution every time out."

Track listing
All compositions by Ornette Coleman.

Side one

Side two

Personnel
 Ornette Coleman — tenor saxophone
 Don Cherry — pocket trumpet
 Jimmy Garrison — bass
 Ed Blackwell — drums

References

1962 albums
Ornette Coleman albums
Atlantic Records albums
Albums produced by Nesuhi Ertegun